is a paralympic athlete from Japan competing mainly in category T11 sprint events.

Shigeki competed in the 100m and 200m at three consecutive Paralympics in 1996, 2000 and 2004, however he only won one medal and that was a silver medal as part of the Japanese 4 × 100 m relay team in 2000.

References

Paralympic athletes of Japan
Athletes (track and field) at the 1996 Summer Paralympics
Athletes (track and field) at the 2000 Summer Paralympics
Athletes (track and field) at the 2004 Summer Paralympics
Paralympic silver medalists for Japan
Living people
Medalists at the 2000 Summer Paralympics
Year of birth missing (living people)
Paralympic medalists in athletics (track and field)
Japanese male sprinters
Visually impaired sprinters
Paralympic sprinters